The Insurance Regulatory Authority of Uganda (IRAU) is a government agency mandated to "ensure the effective administration, supervision, regulation and control of the business of Insurance in Uganda".

Location
The headquarters of IRAU are located in the Legacy Towers Complex at 5 Kyaddondo Road on Nakasero Hill in the Kampala Central Division. The coordinates of the IRAU headquarters are 0°19'49.0"N, 32°34'41.0"E (Latitude:0.330278; Longitude:32.578056).

In March 2018, construction began on Insurance Towers, a 13-floor skyscraper to house the headquarters of IRAU. The  building is being built by Roko Construction Company Limited, at a cost of USh28.4 billion (approx. US$7.6 million). Completion is expected in September 2019.

History
The agency was created in 1997 by an Act of Parliament. This followed the liberalization and privatization policies of Uganda's government, which ended its direct provision of goods and services and the adoption the role of supervisor and regulator.

Administration
The policy-setting, seven-member board of directors is chaired by Isaac Nkote Nabeta. The seven-person Senior Management Team is led by Kaddunabbi Ibrahim Lubega, the chief executive officer, who also sits on the board.

Recent developments
In July 2014, IRAU directed every insurer in the country to form separate companies dealing in life business (life policies, annuities, etc.) and general business (liability, automobile, general risk, etc.). The objective was to prevent a downturn in one type of business from spreading risk across the entire industry. Also, foreign insurance companies were instructed to have no more than two non-Ugandans in their top management, with one of the top two being Ugandan. That same regulation also required at least half the members of the board of directors of each insurance company to reside inside Uganda. These measures were aimed at encouraging the development of local talent and capacity building within the industry. Businesses were given until 1 January 2015 to comply.

See also
Economy of Uganda

References

External links 
Official Website

Financial services companies established in 1997
Regulatory agencies of Uganda
Organizations established in 1997
Organisations based in Kampala
1997 establishments in Uganda
Insurance in Uganda
Insurance organizations
Insurance regulation